Stephen Norris Bourdow (born January 2, 1966) is an American former competitive sailor who won a silver medal at the 1992 Olympic Games in Barcelona. He was born in Saginaw, Michigan.

Career
At the 1992 Summer Olympics, Bourdow finished in 2nd place in the Flying Dutchman along with his partner Paul Foerster.

References

 

1966 births
American male sailors (sport)
Sailors at the 1992 Summer Olympics – Flying Dutchman
Olympic silver medalists for the United States in sailing
Living people
Sportspeople from Saginaw, Michigan
Medalists at the 1992 Summer Olympics
Flying Dutchman class world champions
World champions in sailing for the United States